The Expanders are an American roots reggae band from Los Angeles, California.

Biography

Formation and Self-titled album
The Expanders formed in Los Angeles, California in the summer of 2003. The band's sound is influenced by vintage 1970s and early 1980s Jamaican reggae groups, with three-part vocal harmonies, conscious songwriting, and an indie-DIY spirit.

The Expanders self-titled debut album was recorded from 2006 to 2010 and was released in 2011 on Man-Like Records. It captured the retro Jamaican sound they hoped to create by recording at Killion Sound studio in Los Angeles, California alongside sound engineer Jay Bonner, the original bass player for The Aggrolites.

First Covers album
In 2012, The Expanders released a covers album titled, Old Time Something Come Back Again, Vol. 1, a free 13-track covers album of rare Jamaican songs. It was released on Jump Up! Records.

Hustling Culture
The Expanders returned to L.A.'s Killion Sound studio between 2012 and 2014 to record their third studio album (second original song album) Hustling Culture. Recordings were done entirely on analogue tape.

In 2015, the band signed with New York City's Easy Star Records, who released Hustling Culture on June 26, 2015. They explained, "Hustling Culture is the band coming into its own with our songwriting and musicianship." The album debuted #1 on the Billboard's chart of Top Reggae Albums.

Second Covers album
On September 29, 2017, The Expanders released their second covers album and fourth studio album, Old Time Something Come Back Again, Vol. 2 via Easy Star Records. The album was their second release to debut #1 on the Billboard chart of Top Reggae Albums. The second volume features The Expanders versions of songs by Burning Spear, The Gladiators, The Ethiopians, The Itals, Little Roy, Yabby You, among other reggae artists.

Change in the Lineup
In 2018, there was a change in the lineup when rhythm guitarist Devin Morrison left the band, which was an amicable departure to explore other musical endeavors. Along with the remaining members, the band added Evan Heins from Ital Vibes and Prime Livity on bass. They also switched Chiquis Lozoya from bass to lead vocals rhythm guitar.

Collaborations & Riddim albums
Also in 2018, The Expanders collaborated with renowned Grammy Award-winning producer Walshy Fire for two separate riddim albums of their tracks "Top Shelf" and "Thanks For Life." The albums feature vocals from reggae artists like Cocoa Tea, Randy Valentine, Queen Omega, Fyakin, and others.

The Expanders collaborated with Kyle McDonald of Slightly Stoopid on a track titled "Sweet & Slow" which was released on November 22, 2019.

In the summer of 2020, The Expanders were asked to record two covers of classic Toots & Maytals songs in anticipation of a month-long tribute to Toots Hibbert on Rootfire. However, directly after they finished the recordings, the legendary reggae icon passed away at 77 years old after contacting COVID-19. The band released their two-track tribute EP Two For Toots on October 23, 2020. It featured covers "True Love" and "Love Is Gonna To Let Me Down". The proceeds from the album was donated to Toots' family.

On November 6, 2020, The Expanders once again teamed up Walshy Fire for another riddim album of their title track "Peace of Love". The album featured artists such as Buzzrock, Blessed, Hanali, Tóke, Promise No Promises and more reggae artists.

Lineup

Current band members
John Butcher – Lead Guitar, Backing Vocals (2003–Present)
Chiquis Lozoya – Lead Vocals,  Rhythm Guitar, (formerly Bass & Backing Vocals until 2018) (2003–Present)
John Asher – Drums, Backing Vocals (2003–Present)
Roy Fishell – Keyboard  (2014–Present)
Evan Heins – Bass (2018–Present)

Past band members
Devin Morrison – Guitar, lead Vocals (2011–2018)

Discography

Studio albums

Riddim albums

Singles

References 

American reggae musical groups
Easy Star Records artists